Mount Church, at  above sea level is the third highest peak in Idaho and the Lost River Range. The peak is located in Salmon-Challis National Forest in Custer County. The peak has not been officially named or measured, but it has been unofficially named after Frank Church, a former Senator from Idaho.

References 

Church
Church
Salmon-Challis National Forest